Zalman Yanovsky (December 19, 1944 – December 13, 2002) was a Canadian folk-rock musician. Born in Toronto, he was the son of political cartoonist Avrom Yanovsky and teacher Nechama Yanovsky (née Gemeril), who died in 1958. He played lead guitar and sang for the Lovin' Spoonful, a rock band which he founded with John Sebastian in 1964. He was inducted into the Canadian Music Hall of Fame in 1996. He was also inducted into the Rock and Roll Hall of Fame in 2000 as a member of the Lovin’ Spoonful. He was married to actress Jackie Burroughs, with whom he had one daughter, Zoe.

Musical career
One of the early rock and roll performers to wear a cowboy hat, and fringed "Davy Crockett" style clothing, Zal helped set the trend followed by such 1960s performers as Sonny Bono, Johnny Rivers, and David Crosby.

Mostly self-taught, he began his musical career playing folk music coffee houses in Toronto.  He lived on a kibbutz in Israel for a short time before returning to Canada. He teamed with fellow Canadian Denny Doherty in the Halifax Three. The two joined Cass Elliot in the Mugwumps, a group mentioned by Doherty's and Cass's later group the Mamas & the Papas in the song "Creeque Alley". It was at this time that he met John Sebastian, and they formed the Lovin' Spoonful with Steve Boone and Joe Butler. According to Sebastian: "He could play like Elmore James, he could play like Floyd Cramer, he could play like Chuck Berry. He could play like all these people, yet he still had his own overpowering personality. Out of this we could, I thought, craft something with real flexibility."

In 1966, he was arrested in the United States on a marijuana-related charge. Returning to his native Canada, he recorded the solo album Alive and Well in Argentina (and Loving Every Minute of It). Buddah Records released the album in the U.S. in 1968, along with "As Long as You're Here", a single that did not appear on the album. The single (on which the B-side was the same track without vocals and recorded backwards) just missed the Billboard Hot 100, but fared a little better in Cashbox, peaking at No. 73, and reaching No. 57 in the Canadian RPM Magazine charts. Kama Sutra Records reissued the album in 1971 with a completely different cover, and the inclusion of "As Long as You're Here".

While a member of Kris Kristofferson's backing band at the Isle of Wight Festival 1970, he had a brief reunion with John Sebastian; Sebastian had been (apparently) unaware of Yanovsky's presence, and was made aware by a message passed through the crowd, written on a toilet roll.

He also appeared in the Off-Broadway show National Lampoon's Lemmings at New York's Village Gate. Although not an original cast member, he contributed a musical number "Nirvana Banana", a Donovan parody.

Restaurateur
After retiring from the music business, Yanovsky became a chef and restaurateur, establishing, alongside his second wife Rose Richardson, Chez Piggy restaurant in 1979 and Pan Chancho Bakery in 1994, both in Kingston, Ontario. He had worked as a chef at The Golden Apple (in Gananoque, Ontario) and, in the mid-1970s, at Dr. Bull's (in Kingston). The success of Chez Piggy prompted the publication of a companion cookbook (The Chez Piggy Cookbook, Firefly Books, 1998) that was collected by fans. After Yanovsky's death of an apparent heart attack in December 2002, and Richardson's death in 2005, his daughter Zoe Yanovsky (with actress Jackie Burroughs) took over the ownership of both eateries. Zoe also completed and launched another cookbook that Zal was working on, titled The Pan Chancho Cookbook (Bookmakers Press, 2006).

Personal life
Yanovsky met Canadian actress Jackie Burroughs in a laundromat in Toronto, where he was sleeping in a dryer while homeless. They were married in 1961 and had one daughter, Zoe, before separating in 1968. He subsequently married Rose Richardson, who died in 2005. His step-mother was Anna Yanovsky (née Atanas), who died in 2022.

Death
Yanovsky died on December 13, 2002, in Kingston, Ontario, from a heart attack, six days before his 58th birthday. A funeral service was held in Kingston, Ontario on December 16, 2002.

Discography

Singles
"As Long as You're Here" (Billboard No. 101, Cashbox No. 73, RPM No. 57) — 1968

Albums
Alive and Well in Argentina – Buddah BDS-5019 – 1968
Raven in a Cage / You Talk Too Much / Last Date / Little Bitty Pretty One / Alive and Well in Argentina / Brown to Blue / Priscilla Millionaira / I Almost Lost My Mind / Hip Toad / Lt. Schtinckhausen
Alive and Well in Argentina – Kama Sutra KSBS-2030 – 1971
Same tracks as above, but also includes "As Long as You're Here" (side 1, track 6).  Completely different album cover and liner notes than the original release

See also

Canadian rock
Music of Canada

References

External links
 [ Yanovsky's entry in Allmusic]

1944 births
2002 deaths
20th-century Canadian male singers
20th-century Canadian guitarists
Buddah Records artists
Businesspeople from Toronto
Canadian company founders
Canadian expatriates in the United States
Canadian folk guitarists
Canadian male guitarists
Canadian folk rock musicians
Canadian Music Hall of Fame inductees
Canadian people of Ukrainian-Jewish descent
Canadian record producers
Canadian restaurateurs
Canadian rock guitarists
Canadian songwriters
Food and drink company founders
Jewish Canadian musicians
Jewish singers
Lead guitarists
Musicians from Toronto
The Lovin' Spoonful members